The United Church, Nilokheri is the one of the two Protestant Churches in Nilokheri, it is the only CNI Church in the area.

History
With the establishment of Nilokheri township the CNI Church was established in 1950 by the Protestant Indian Christians.

Church Structure
The church building was renovated recently. It is a kind of a big spacious hall and an altar.

Parish members
There are 50 families and total strength of 250 people. Christian devotees are the people from various regions of India such as Jharkhand, Punjab, South India etc. apart from local Christians who settled here due to the reason of employment.

References

Churches in Haryana
Church of North India church buildings